The Santo Ângelo micro-region (Microrregião de Santo Ângelo) is a micro-region in the western part of the state of Rio Grande do Sul, Brazil.  The area is 10,750.721 km².

Municipalities 
The microregion consists of the following municipalities:
 Bossoroca
 Catuípe
 Dezesseis de Novembro
 Entre-Ijuís
 Eugênio de Castro
 Giruá
 Pirapó
 Rolador
 Santo Ângelo
 Santo Antônio das Missões
 São Luiz Gonzaga
 São Miguel das Missões
 São Nicolau
 Senador Salgado Filho
 Ubiretama
 Vitória das Missões

References

Microregions of Rio Grande do Sul